Scott Graham (born June 10, 1965) is an American sportscaster best known for his broadcasts of the Philadelphia Phillies, his work with NFL Films, and his studio hosting of The NFL on Westwood One. He has lived and worked near Philadelphia for most of his professional life. He was born June 10, 1965 in Belleville, New Jersey, and now lives in Voorhees Township, New Jersey. Graham graduated from Pingry School in 1983. His sportscasting résumé covers several organizations in Philadelphia and around the United States. Graham is a graduate of the University of Pennsylvania, where he earned a Bachelor of Arts in political science.

Broadcasting stints
Graham's first play-by-play experience came as a student announcer for football and basketball while at Penn on WXPN.  After graduating from college, Graham was sports director at WAMS in Wilmington, 1987–89, called football games for Delaware State from 1990 to 1992, then for the University of Pennsylvania the following three years. From 1992 to 1998, he called Philadelphia's Big Five basketball games on WPHT-AM. In 1994, he hosted a nationally syndicated baseball call-in show and called major college football games for the American Sports Radio Network. In 1996, Graham was hired by Comcast Network as an announcer for all sporting events on the station. From 1999 to 2003, he called NFL and NFL Europe games on Fox.

He currently narrates several programs for NFL Films and calls college basketball for Comcast Network, ESPN, FS1, and Westwood One as well Philadelphia Eagles preseason with Ross Tucker, and previously with  Mike Mayock and  Brian Baldinger.

In 2009, he began co-hosting Baseball This Morning on XM satellite radio channel 175 with Buck Martinez from 7:00–10:00 a.m. Eastern time. In February 2010, he left the morning show along with Martinez.

Career with the Phillies
Graham was first hired by the Philadelphia Phillies in 1991, and hosted the pre-and post-game shows through the 2000 season.  In 1999, he also became a play-by-play announcer for the team.

He called the first, second, and third innings of games on the radio; the fourth, fifth, and sixth innings on the local telecast; and then returned to the radio broadcast to call the seventh, eighth, and ninth innings. After every Phillies victory, his signature call would be "Put this one in the win column for the Fightin' Phils!"
Another signature call was his home run call: "That ball is gone-a!"

In November 2006, The Philadelphia Inquirer reported that Graham's contract would not be renewed, which was confirmed on December 4, 2006.  
Graham was a finalist for a position with the San Diego Padres for the 2007 season but the job went to Andy Masur. In late November 2007, his name came up as a candidate for the New York Mets radio broadcast vacancy left by Tom McCarthy.  The Mets hired Wayne Hagin for the position.

NFL work
In 2006 Graham began working as a pregame host for Sunday Night Football coverage on Westwood One. In 2009, he became Westwood One's studio host for all NFL games except Monday night, replacing Tommy Tighe.

Having already done narration work for many NFL Films features, Graham was named as the voice of Showtime's Inside the NFL program, taking over the duties of his late former Phillies broadcast partner and fellow NFL Films narrator Harry Kalas.  Graham made his Inside the NFL debut on the September 9, 2009 episode.  He also does pre- and post-game NFL coverage for Westwood One radio. He was the public address system announcer at MetLife Stadium for Super Bowl XLVIII, at University of Phoenix Stadium for Super Bowl XLIX and Levi's Stadium for Super Bowl 50.

Miscellaneous
Graham provided the narration for the Puppy Bowl from 2012 until 2020 on Animal Planet. His late Phillies partner Harry Kalas had narrated the program from 2005 to 2009.

Graham also does voiceover work for the WWE Network program Rivalries.

Graham called play-by-play of the 2016 NCAA Final Four and National Championship Game on TruTV as part of the Villanova "Team Stream" broadcast, alongside former Villanova and NFL wide receiver Brian Finneran. He reprised the role when Villanova returned to the Final Four two years later, paired this time with Wildcat and NBA player Randy Foye.

References

Sources
MLB.com – Philadelphia Phillies: Broadcasters

Living people
1965 births
American radio sports announcers
American television sports announcers
College basketball announcers in the United States
Women's college basketball announcers in the United States
College football announcers
Delaware State Hornets football
Major League Baseball broadcasters
National Football League announcers
Penn Quakers basketball
Penn Quakers football
People from Belleville, New Jersey
Sportspeople from Philadelphia
People from Voorhees Township, New Jersey
NFL Europe broadcasters
Philadelphia Phillies announcers
Sports in Philadelphia
University of Pennsylvania alumni
University of Pennsylvania faculty
NFL Films people
Philadelphia Eagles announcers